David Edwardes (c. 1630 – 1690) was a member of the Edwardes family of Rhydygors Carmarthen. He was appointed a deputy herald by Clarenceux King of Arms. He died without issue.

He married Elizabeth, daughter of David Morgan of Coed Llwyd, Pembrokeshire. He was the deputy herald for Cardiganshire, Brecknock, Pembrokeshire, Carmarthenshire and Glamorgan. He compiled large genealogical volumes and he was an armorist. He was consulted by contemporary British and Continental genealogists. His will was proved in Carmarthen on the 31st November 1690. William Lewes of Llwynderw acquired his collections after his death.

References 

Welsh genealogists
17th-century births
1690 deaths
17th-century Welsh historians